"Monster" is a song recorded by Red Velvet - Irene & Seulgi, the first sub-unit of South Korean girl group Red Velvet, for their 2020 eponymous debut extended play. A dance-pop track with influence from dubstep genre, the song was written by songwriter Kenzie, while production was handled by Yaakov 'Yash' Gruzman, Jenson Vaughn, Delaney Jane and Yoo Young-jin. It was released on July 6, 2020 by SM Entertainment and Dreamus, serving as the lead single from their first major release.

Music video
The music video for the song was scheduled to be released with the song on July 6 but it was delayed and eventually released the next day. On June 4, 2021, the music video for the track reached 100 million views on YouTube.

Commercial performance
"Monster" debuted at number 8 on the South Korean Gaon Digital Chart, becoming the duo's first top 10 hit. It debuted atop the Download chart for the period July 5—11, 2020 and peaked at number 13 on the component Streaming Chart. The song entered the Billboard K-Pop 100 at number 28 on the chart issue dated July 11, 2020. It peaked at number three in the following week. The track appeared as the 157th biggest hit single on 2020's Gaon Year-End Digital Chart. 

In Malaysia, "Monster" debuted at 16, and peaked at eight. The song debuted at number 30 on the New Zealand Hot Singles Chart. In Singapore, the track debuted at 18 on the Streaming Chart, and peaked at five. The song also debuted at number six on the Regional Chart, and peaked at two. On the Billboard World Digital Song Sales chart, the track debuted and peaked at number seven becoming the duo's first top 10 hit on the chart.

Critical reception 
Following its initial release, "Monster" was met with mixed to positive reviews from music critics. Rania Aniftos of Billboard magazine described the track as "bold", further praising Irene and Seulgi for "preaching their confident individuality, and the "monster" inside as they deliver sultry choreography weaved in with eerie, paranormal scenery.". Writer Riddhi Chakraborty of Rolling Stone India described the song as "one of the most stand-out singles of the year" referring to the subunit's "fascinating use of dark pop and dubstep". On another song review, writers Kim Sung-hwan, Yeol Shim-hi, Yoo Seong-eun, and Cha Yoo-jung of Y-Magazine described the track as "well-organized, from narratives reminiscent of delicate horror movies", further adding the "style with the energy of thought in the midst of mystery by utilizing its bold movements and images of femme fatale", while rating the track with three point five stars out of five. In an individual album review, Kim Do-heon of IZM viewed the track as "a neat composition without superfluousness" adding that "there is a lack of element that can be imprinted".

Buzzfeed ranked the song number 30 on their list, citing it as "delightfully scary as they detail possessing someone and toying with them as they struggle to break free from their hold". Dazed magazine chose the song as one of their 40 best K-pop songs of 2020 describing the subunit's "gratifyingly noisy, and lyrically teasing" song. The song was featured on Metros 'The best K-Pop comebacks of 2020 ranked' at number 8, describing "Monster" as "sexy and slightly terrifying". Nación Rex described the song as "elegant, mysterious, and obscure" further praising Irene and Seulgi for portraying their "artistic essence". Rolling Stone India praised the song as "plenty of glamor and glitter"  further adding the "imagery that can only be defined as creepy". Furthermore, Teen Vogue described the song as "ferocious" and "intensely fun".

 Accolades 
On July 17, 2020, "Monster" managed to achieve a music show trophy from Music Bank. It also got nominated for the "Artist of the Year – Digital Music (July)" in Gaon Chart Music Awards. However, Kriz who worked in the song's chorus won the "Performer of the Year - Chorus" in the same award show.

 Credits and personnel 
Credits adapted from the liner notes of Monster.Studio Recorded, edited, engineered for mix, and mixed at SM BoomingSystem
 Recorded at SM Blue Cup Studio
 Mastered at Sonic KoreaPersonnel'

 Red Velvet - Irene & Seulgivocals, background vocals
 KenzieKorean lyrics, vocal directing
 Yaakov 'Yash' Gruzmancomposition, arrangement, drums, keyboards & synths, programming
 Delaney Janecomposition, background vocals
 Jenson Vaughncomposition
 Yoo Young-jincomposition, vocal directing, recording, digital editing, mixing engineer, mixing
 Krizbackground vocals
 Jeong Eui-seokrecording
 Jung Yu-radigital editing
 Jeon Hoonmastering

Charts

Weekly charts

Monthly charts

Year-end charts

Release history

See also 

 List of Music Bank Chart Winners (2020)

Notes

References

2020 debut singles
2020 songs
Red Velvet (group) songs
Korean-language songs
SM Entertainment singles
Songs written by Kenzie (songwriter)
Songs written by Yoo Young-jin
2020 singles